Denis Borisovich Glushakov (born 27 January 1987) is a Russian international footballer who plays for Pari NN and the Russian national team as a defensive midfielder and box-to-box midfielder.

Career

Club
From 2005 to 2013, Glushakov played for Lokomotiv Moscow.

He then joined Spartak Moscow, of which he ultimately became Captain. He was a key figure in its 2016-17 victory in the Russian Premier League, assisting and scoring a number of crucial goals. On 19 June 2019, Glushakov was released from his Spartak contract by mutual consent. This was after a controversy, during which fans accused him of supporting the removal of manager Massimo Carrera, who was the first Spartak manager to win the Russian Premier League in over a decade.

On 29 June 2019, Glushakov signed a one-year contract, with the option of a second, with Akhmat Grozny. On 4 August 2020, Glushakov announced that he left Akhmat.

On 1 October 2020, he signed with Khimki. On 8 July 2021, he extended his contract the end of the 2023–24 season, and he remained a key figure in the squad On 10 January 2023, Glushakov's contract with Khimki was terminated by mutual consent.

On 10 February 2023, Glushakov signed with Russian Premier League club Pari NN until the end of the season, with an option to extend.

International
 In March 2011, he was for the first time called up to the Russia national football team. He made his national team debut on 29 March 2011 in a friendly against Qatar. On 11 October 2011 he scored his first goal for Russia in a Euro 2012 qualifier against Andorra. 
He was confirmed for the finalized UEFA Euro 2012 squad on 25 May 2012. He was left on the bench in the first two games, before starting the third group game against Greece as Russia was eliminated at group stage.

On 2 June 2014, he was included in the Russia's 2014 FIFA World Cup squad. He started all 3 games that Russia played at the tournament.

On 15 June 2016, Glushakov scored with a header in a 2–1 defeat against Slovakia at Euro 2016. He appeared as a substitute in the first two group games before starting against Wales.

On 11 May 2018, he was included in Russia's extended 2018 FIFA World Cup squad as a back-up. He was not included in the finalized World Cup squad.

Personal life
His uncle Valeri Glushakov was a professional footballer as well.

Career statistics

Club

International

International goals

Honours

Club
Spartak Moscow
Russian Premier League: 2016-17
Russian Super Cup: 2017
Match Premier Cup: 2019

Individual
 List of 33 top players of the Russian league: 2013/14.

References

External links

1987 births
People from Millerovsky District
Sportspeople from Rostov Oblast
Living people
Russian footballers
Association football midfielders
Russia international footballers
Russia under-21 international footballers
FC SKA Rostov-on-Don players
FC Zvezda Irkutsk players
FC Lokomotiv Moscow players
FC Spartak Moscow players
FC Akhmat Grozny players
FC Khimki players
FC Nizhny Novgorod (2015) players
Russian Premier League players
Russian First League players
Russian Second League players
UEFA Euro 2012 players
2014 FIFA World Cup players
UEFA Euro 2016 players
2017 FIFA Confederations Cup players